Jorge Mondragón Roldán (April 30, 1903 in Mexico City – April 30, 1997 in Mexico City) was a Mexican actor. His son, Jorge Mondragón Jr., is also an actor.

Selected filmography
Five Faces of Woman (1947)
 The Desire (1948)
 The Magician (1949)
 Lost (1950)
 My General's Women (1951)
 Love for Sale (1951)
 The Atomic Fireman (1952)
 The King of Mexico (1956)
 His First Love (1960)
 The Pulque Tavern (1981)

References

Biographical Dictionary of Mexican Film Performers "M" Part 2

1903 births
1997 deaths
Male actors from Mexico City
20th-century Mexican male actors